Critical, styled with a time-clock format as CR:IT:IC:AL, is a British medical drama series that aired on Sky 1 from 24 February to 19 May 2015. The series is set in a fictional major trauma centre (MTC), City General Hospital, which treats critically ill patients. Each episode is based on one patient and efforts to save his or her life within one hour. Created by Jed Mercurio (Line of Duty and Bodies), the drama follows the team of medical professionals whilst they make life-changing decisions. The title refers to critical condition, the most serious medical state, as well as the decisions and actions of the staff; everything done within the first hour is absolutely vital and could determine whether a patient lives or dies. The show was axed on 15 July 2015 after the series pulled in an average of 192,000 viewers.

Cast
 Lennie James as Glen Boyle, Trauma Consultant and Team Leader 
 Catherine Walker as Fiona Lomas, Vascular Surgical Registrar and Trauma Fellow 
 Kimberley Nixon as Dr. Angharad ('Harry') Bennett-Edwards, Senior House Officer
 Neve McIntosh as Nicola Hicklin, Consultant Nurse, Acting Clinical Lead and Deputy Clinical Lead 
 John MacMillan as Justin Costello, Staff Nurse
 Danny Kirrane as Billy Finlay, Operating Department Practitioner
 Prasanna Puwanarajah as Ramakrishna Chandramohan, Anaesthetics Registrar
 Peter Sullivan as Clive Archerfield, Clinical Lead Consultant and Major Incident Officer
 Mali Harries as Nerys Merrick, Ward Sister
 Paul Bazely as Giles Dhillon, Trauma Manager
 Emma Fryer as Rebecca Osgood, Orthopaedic Registrar 
 Juliet Oldfield as Shelley Imms, Radiographer
 Jack Fortune as Robert Street, Consultant General Surgeon
 Claire Skinner as Lorraine Rappaport, Consultant Trauma Surgeon, Consultant Vascular Surgeon and Trauma Team Leader 
 Orion Lee as Brian Zhao, CT Radiographer

Guest cast
 Maya Barcot as Tessa Yarwood (4 episodes)
 Daphne Cheung as Debbie Wong (4 episodes)
 Anna Koval as Ania Dubczek (4 episodes)
 Kirsten Foster as Dalisay Guinto (3 episodes)
 Garry Marriott as Lloyd Watson, Paramedic (2 episodes)
 Elliot Cowan as Tom Farrow, O/G Consultant (2 episodes)
 Tim Faraday as Bob Webster (6 episodes)

Episodes

Reception
Reviews were predominantly positive, noting the ground-breaking style and structure of the series; however some critics expressed a preference for a more traditional approach to medical drama.

International broadcasters
In Australia, the series premiered on BBC First on 28 July 2015.

References

External links

2015 British television series debuts
2015 British television series endings
2010s British drama television series
2010s British medical television series
2010s British television miniseries
English-language television shows
Sky UK original programming
Television series by Hat Trick Productions